Kliptown is a suburb of the formerly black township of Soweto in Gauteng, South Africa, located about 17 km south-west of Johannesburg. Kliptown is the oldest residential district of Soweto, and was first laid out in 1891 on land which formed part of Klipspruit farm. The farm was named after the klipspruit (rocky stream) that runs nearby. From 1903 the area was home to informal settlements (squatter camps), and the area now contains a mixture of purpose-built housing and many shacks and other informal homes which form the Chris Hani and Dlamini settlements.

History 
In June, 1955, Kliptown was the home of an unprecedented Congress of the People, organised by the African National Congress, the South African Indian Congress, the South African Congress of Democrats and the Coloured People's Congress. This Congress saw the declaration and adoption of the Freedom Charter, which set out the aims and aspirations of the opponents of apartheid.

Economy 
In 2005 Kliptown had an unemployment rate of 72%.  In that same year Johannesburg City Council announced plans for renewal of the Kliptown area, including a large-scale housing project.

In popular culture 
American DJ and producer Skrillex released the single "Kliptown Empyrean" in 2020. Inspired by his experience working with the Kliptown Youth Program alongside the late rapper Riky Rick, the track heavily incorporates samples created with local residents.

Transport

References 
 Musiker, N. and R., 1999. A Concise Historical Dictionary of Greater Johannesburg, Francolin Publishers, Cape Town, South Africa.
 Johannesburg City Council
 Soweto Kliptown Youth (SKY) Community Center

Soweto Townships
Johannesburg Region D
Populated places established in 1903
1903 establishments in Transvaal Colony